Ron Arad may refer to:
 Ron Arad (pilot) (1958–1986), Israeli Air Force weapon systems officer; classified as missing in action since 1986
 Ron Arad (industrial designer) (born 1951), Israeli industrial designer, artist and architect